Zeven is a Samtgemeinde ("collective municipality") in the district of Rotenburg, in Lower Saxony, Germany. Its seat is in the town Zeven.

The Samtgemeinde Zeven consists of the following municipalities:
 Elsdorf 
 Gyhum 
 Heeslingen 
 Zeven

Samtgemeinden in Lower Saxony